Glamour is a 1931 British drama film directed by Seymour Hicks and Harry Hughes and starring Hicks, Ellaline Terriss and Margot Grahame. A young, ruthless woman falls in love with a rising actor. It was loosely remade for the 1934 American film Glamour.  There are currently no known surviving copies of the original film.

Cast
 Seymour Hicks as Henry Garthome
 Ellaline Terriss as Lady Belton
 Margot Grahame as Lady Betty Enfield
 Basil Gill as Lord Westborough
 A. Bromley Davenport as Lord Belton
 Beverley Nichols as Hon. Richard Wells
 Betty Hicks as Lady Armadale
 Clifford Heatherley as Edward Crumbles
 Naomi Jacob as Rosalind Crumbles
 David Hawthorne as Charlie Drummond
 Philip Hewland as Millett
 Arthur Stratton as Fireman
 Charles Paton as Clockwinder
 Margery Binner as Reede
 Eric Marshall as Singer

References

Bibliography
 Low, Rachael. Filmmaking in 1930s Britain. George Allen & Unwin, 1985.
 Wood, Linda. British Films, 1927-1939. British Film Institute, 1986.

External links

1931 films
1931 drama films
Films shot at British International Pictures Studios
British drama films
British black-and-white films
1930s British films
1930s English-language films